V17  may refer to:
 V.17, a telephone communications standard of the ITU-T
 Fokker V.17, a Dutch experimental monoplane fighter aircraft produced by the aircraft
 Rocket Ship Galileo
 V-17 truck